Oliva is a town in Córdoba Province in Argentina.  It is the chief town of the Tercero Arriba Department.

External links

 Municipal website

Populated places in Córdoba Province, Argentina